The Ruwenzori sun squirrel (Heliosciurus ruwenzorii)  is a species of rodent in the family Sciuridae.

It is found in Burundi, Democratic Republic of the Congo, Rwanda, and Uganda.

Its natural habitats are subtropical or tropical moist montane forests and arable land.

References

Heliosciurus
Rodents of Africa
Mammals of Burundi
Mammals of the Democratic Republic of the Congo
Mammals of Rwanda
Mammals of Uganda
Mammals described in 1904
Taxonomy articles created by Polbot